Zimmer Radio is a radio broadcasting group of Zimmer Marketing with six radio stations (four FM, two AM) with studios in Joplin, Missouri.

 KIXQ-FM 102.5, Country
 KSYN-FM 92.5, Top 40
 KJMK-FM 93.9,  Classic Hits
 KXDG-FM 97.9,  Classic rock
 KZRG-AM 1310,  News/Talk also on translator K275BD FM 102.9, also on HD radio via sister station KIXQ, also on translator K290CO FM 105.9 in Neosho
 KZYM-AM 1230,  Personality Talk

All stations are licensed to Joplin except for KJMK and KXDG which are licensed to Webb City, Missouri.

Zimmer Marketing has introduced HD Radio to the Joplin, Missouri market.  KSYN features a simulcast on HD-1 and HD-2 is 80's and 90's pop. KIXQ features a simulcast on HD-1 and a simulcast of KZRG on HD-2. 

Zimmer Marketing's Radio stations played a critical part in the rebuilding process after the May 2011 tornado. Immediately after the storm, Zimmer's six stations began wall-to-wall coverage, broadcasting news and information informing listeners where to go for medical care, where to find food and water, and also connecting separated family members.

References

Mass media in Missouri
Radio broadcasting companies of the United States